Bewsia is a genus of African plants in the grass family. The only known species is Bewsia biflora, widespread across much of sub-Saharan Africa from Ivory Coast to Tanzania to KwaZulu-Natal.

See also 
 List of Poaceae genera

References 

Chloridoideae
Flora of Africa
Monotypic Poaceae genera